The River Strine is a  tributary of the River Tern flowing through the Telford and Wrekin district of Shropshire in England. The river drains the Weald Moors a fenland area north of Telford, and also takes runoff from Newport and Lilleshall. Tributaries of the Strine include the Pipe Strine, Red Strine, and Wall Brook.

Course
The river is formed by the confluence of the Pipe Strine and the Wall Brook. It flows through Cherrington Moor, and past the hamlet of Rodway, and then through Dayhouse and Crudgington Moor, where it is joined by the Commission Drain or Red Strine. Beyond this point it passes the village of Crudgington, where it is bridged by the A442, it then joins the Tern.

Hydrology
The flow of the river was measured at an electromagnetic gauging station in its lower reaches at Crudgington between 1982 and 2009.

See also
List of rivers of England

References

External links

River Strine water levels

Rivers of Shropshire
1